Chenocetah Fire Tower is a historic fire tower in the Chenocetah Mountains, Cornelia, Georgia, Habersham County, Georgia. It was added to the National Register of Historic Places on June 11, 1984. The tower was built in 1937 as part of a public works program by the Farm Security Administration's Resettlement Administration in effort to move and employ impoverished farmers. The purpose of the building was to allow fire fighters to spot fires in the Chattahoochee National Forest.

History
The stone tower measures 40 feet tall and was first dedicated on June 7, 1938. Governor Eurith D. Rivers delivered the dedicatory address and Cornelia Mayor Crawford gave the address of welcome. Charles S. Vance, the project manager who took over from Mr. Woodroof and William A. Hartmen, regional director, were also in attendance. Governor Rivers was taken on a tour of the projects afterwards. The tower was dedicated again after World War II in memory of three forest workers who died during the war.  The tower was used in active service as a fire tower until 1975.  After 1975, it was unused until 1989 when the Georgia Forestry Commission took over staffing during the fire season.  Locals have formed the Chenocetah Conservation Corps to provide grounds maintenance around the structure and surrounding landscape.

Gallery

See also
National Register of Historic Places listings in Habersham County, Georgia

References

Buildings and structures in Habersham County, Georgia
Buildings and structures on the National Register of Historic Places in Georgia (U.S. state)
Towers in Georgia (U.S. state)
Towers completed in 1937
Chattahoochee-Oconee National Forest
National Register of Historic Places in Habersham County, Georgia